Shahjehan Syed Karim was a Pakistani civil servant and educator who served in BPS-22 grade as the Information Secretary of Pakistan and Chief Secretary Sindh. He is best known as founder of Institute of Business Management, one of Pakistan's leading higher education universities. He died at the age of 84.

References

1933 births
2017 deaths
Pakistani educators
Pakistani civil servants
Pakistani people of Bihari descent
People from Patna